Motilal Madan (born January 1, 1939) is an Indian biotechnology researcher, veterinarian, academic and administrator. In a career spanning over 35 years, Madan published 432 research articles and policy papers in international and national reference journals—including 226 original research papers—and pioneered research in reproductive endocrinology, embryo biotechnology, In vitro fertilisation, and cloning.

From 1987 to 1994, Madan served as Project Director of Embryo Transfer Technology at India's premier dairy research institute, the National Dairy Research Institute (NDRI).  He led a research team at the institute that performed the first successful in vitro fertilisation of a buffalo in the world, leading to the birth of a calf, named "Pratham", in November 1990.

From 1994 to 1995, Madan served as the Director (Research) of the NDRI in Karnal and was later, from 1995 to 1999, the Deputy Director General (Animal Science) of the Indian Council of Agricultural Research. In November 2006 he became Vice-Chancellor of the Pandit Deen Dayal Upadhyaya Veterinary Science University, Mathura. Earlier he served as the Vice Chancellor of Dr. Panjabrao Deshmukh Krishi Vidyapeeth in Akola.

Madan was conferred the prestigious Padma Shri, the fourth highest civilian award in the Republic of India, by the Government of India in January 2022 for distinguished service in the fields of science and engineering. While congratulating him, Haryana Chief Minister Manohar Lal Khattar commented that "Madan's accomplishments have brought pride to the country.".

Early Years and Education
Madan was born to a Kashmiri Pandit family in Srinagar, Kashmir on January 1, 1939. He received his BVSc (Veterinary Medicine) degree from Punjab College of Veterinary Science & Animal Husbandry in 1959 with a gold medal. He then obtained his MVSc degree from the National Dairy Research Institute, Karnal with a gold medal in 1965. He then obtained his doctoral (PhD) degree from the University of Missouri, in 1971.

Career 
Vice chancellor, Pt Deendayal Upadhyaya University of Veterinary sciences, Mathura, UP (2006 - 2009)

Chairman, National Task Force in Animal Biotechnology. Dept. of Biotechnology, Govt. of India, New Delhi (1999 - 2004)

Vice-Chancellor, Dr. Panjabrao Deshmukh Agricultural University, Akola, Maharashtra (1999 - 2002)

Deputy Director General (Animal Sciences), Indian Council of Agricultural Research, New Delhi (1995 - 1999)

Joint Director (Research), NDRI, Karnal (1994 - 1995)

Project Director, Embryo Transfer Technology, Science & Technology Mission Project (1987 - 1994)

Professor and Head, Animal Physiology and Head, Dairy Cattle Physiology Division, NDRI, Karnal (1979 - 1990)

Associate Professor, Animal Production Physiology, Haryana Agriculture University, Hisar (1972–79)

Assistant Professor, Animal Production Physiology, HAU, Hisar (1966–72)

Demonstrator, Dairy Husbandry, National Dairy Research Institute (1965 - 1966)

Veterinary Assistant Surgeon & Animal Husbandry Extension Officer, J&K State Government (1959 - 1963)

Awards 
Haryana Vigyan Ratna Award (2020): Given by the Government of Haryana for his contributions to the field of science and technology.

Doctor of Science (2001): 'Honoris Causa' from the Chandra Shekhar Azad University of Agriculture & Technology, Kanpur, Uttar Pradesh.

Honorary PhD (2012): Received from the University of Guelph, Ontario, Canada at the summer convocation of Ontario Veterinary College. He also gave a seminar at the Ontario Veterinary College, and participated in the President's Dialogue.

Life Time Achievement Award (2011): Indian Society for Study of Reproduction and Fertility for outstanding contribution in the field of Reproductive Health.

Dr B.P.Pal Award (2006): Conferred by National Academy of Agriculture Sciences for singular overall contribution to Agriculture.

Bhasin Award (2002): The prestigious National Science and Technology Award given in the area of “Agriculture and Allied Sciences” for significant achievements and outstanding scientific leadership in Science and Technology contributing to a significant impact on National Development.

Rafi Ahmed Kidwai Award (1992): The prestigious National award in Agricultural Sciences conferred by Indian Council of Agricultural Research, New Delhi for outstanding research contribution in the area of Animal Production.

Hari Om Award (1990): Prestigious National Award conferred by Indian Council of Agricultural Research for outstanding contributions in the area of Animal Sciences (work Physiology).

Distinguished Veterinarian Award (DIVA) (2002): Indian Association for the Advancement of Veterinary Research Distinguished Veterinarian Award (DIVA)-2002 for outstanding contribution to Veterinary Profession and the Contemporary Society.

AGOURI Award (1995): Honoured by Japanese Society of Animal Reproduction for contribution towards advancement of Animal Reproduction Bio-technology.

Alumni Excellence Award (2004): in recognition of Contributions to the Growth of Animal Biotechnology and bringing the name and fame for National Dairy Research Institute, Karnal.

SAPI Honorific Award (2002): Society of Animal Physiologists of India Award for distinctive contribution in Animal Physiology.

Malika Trivedi IAAVR Award (1997): Presented by the Indian Association for advancement of Veterinary Research in recognition to contributions to Veterinary Research.

D.Sundaresan Award (1989): Awarded in recognition of outstanding contribution in the field of Dairy Production Research in India for the biennium 1987-88

Nirmalan Memorial Award (1995): Awarded for distinguished contribution to the Science of Physiology by Society of Animal Physiologists of India.

International Science Pioneer Award (1985): Awarded for “Valuable scientific contributions in the domain of science and technology for the welfare of humanity” at the First World Buffalo Congress, Cairo, Egypt.

Nalis Lagerlof Award (1985 and 1997): Awarded twice for Outstanding Research publication in the field of Reproduction by Indian Society for the Study of Animal Reproduction.

Rotary Award (1988): Presented the Rotary International Merit Award for contributions in the area of Science by Rotary International.

AJAS Purina Award (1999): For outstanding research publication in the Asian-Australasian Journal of Animal Sciences published by the Asian Australasian Association (AAAP) (Award given once in four years).

Rotary Service Excellence Award (2001): Rotary International Award for outstanding contribution and exemplary service in the field of Education and to the Course of Community at large.

Hon. Colonel Commandant, National Cadet Core (NCC), appointed by the Government of India, Ministry of Defence.

References 

1939 births
Indian biotechnologists
Living people
Indian veterinarians
Indian scientists